Poynette may refer to:
Poynette, West Virginia, a community in Pleasants County, West Virginia
Poynette, Wisconsin, a village in Columbia County, Wisconsin